Voykove, renamed Blahodatne in 2016, is an urban-type settlement in Khartsyzk Municipality, Donetsk Raion of Donetsk Oblast in eastern Ukraine.

Demographics
Native language as of the Ukrainian Census of 2001:
 Ukrainian 19.67%
 Russian 80.33%

References

Urban-type settlements in Donetsk Raion